Castlepook or Castle Pook is a Norman style castle built in 1380 by the Synan family.

The castle stands at coordinates , a few miles north of Doneraile, in the foothills of the Ballyhoura Mountains in County Cork, Ireland.

Castlepook is made of limestone, with a stone vaulted roof which is still intact.  There was once a spiral staircase made of stone in the southwest corner. Much of the smooth stone (such as was used for the stairs and window / door frames) has been removed by vandals.

References

External links 
 Castlepook Image Gallery @ SFHS

Castles in County Cork